Tuolumne Meadows is a gentle, dome-studded, sub-alpine meadow area along the Tuolumne River in the eastern section of Yosemite National Park in the United States. The term Tuolumne Meadows is also often used to describe a large portion of the Yosemite high country around the meadows, especially in context of rock climbing.

Natural history
The meadow vegetation is supported by shallow groundwater. The water comes from 1,000 mm (39 inches) of precipitation annually, predominantly in the form of snow. Water arises from snowmelt and hill-slope aquifers, and flows through the Tuolumne River, Budd Creek, Delaney Creek, and Unicorn Creek. In spring, as soon as the snow melts, it is not uncommon to see large areas of the meadows flooded and practically transformed into lakes.

While the mountains of the Sierra Nevada near the meadows have had some permanent snowfields, in the summer they are mostly free of snow. Although brief, the late spring and summer wildflower bloom in Tuolumne Meadows is host to a wide variety of California wildflowers, including the relatively rare Purple Webber, a type of lupin.

Plant species composition changes across the meadows with different landforms, landscape positions, and summer water-table depths. Areas with seasonal flooding and deep-standing water support the inflated sedge and Sierra willow. The main herbaceous wet meadow species include alpine aster, nearly-black sedge, King's ricegrass, western bistort, Breweri's reed grass, and dwarf bilberry. Thread-leaved sedge, pussy-toes, Sierra lodgepole pine, and Ross sedge are found in drier uplands within or on the edge of the meadows.

Recreation

Tuolumne Meadows has a good view of the Cathedral Range and Unicorn Peak (to the south), Lembert Dome, and Mount Dana (to the east). Camping is available at the Tuolumne Meadows campground (reservations recommended). Excellent hiking and rock climbing are accessible from Tuolumne Meadows, which tends to be less crowded than Yosemite Valley. Downstream (flowing to the right (western) side of the image), the Tuolumne River cascades over Waterwheel Falls near Glen Aulin, eventually pooling at Hetch Hetchy Reservoir.

The road to the meadows is generally free of snow from June through October. Due to the extreme elevation, road access over Tioga Pass along Highway 120 is closed through winter season.

Hiking 

Many backcountry hiking and backpacking trails start in Tuolumne Meadows including the primary route to summit Mount Lyell, the highest peak in Yosemite National Park. The John Muir and the Pacific Crest Trails are long-distance backpacking trails and follow a route through Lyell Canyon into Tuolumne Meadows. A large number of backpackers hike these trails each year. Along with these longer trails, Tuolumne Meadows feature a wide range of day trails to locations including Gaylor Lakes, Cathedral Lakes, Mono Pass, and Lembert Dome. The day hike trails are popular, and become busy during the summer high seasons. These trails are serviced by the Tuolumne Meadows shuttle bus, typically from June to September, though the dates are subject to change due to weather.

Rock climbing
In contrast to the big walls of Yosemite Valley, climbing at Tuolumne generally consists of short- to medium-length routes on eleven major domes and a number of minor ones, stretching from the Stately Pleasure Dome above Tenaya Lake to Lembert Dome on the east side of the Meadows. Since the area is all at a high elevation, the climbing season is mainly limited to June through September.

The rock is porphyritic granite, a very strong form of granite. It has a tendency for exfoliation, which helps produce and preserve the distinctive dome shapes. The resulting climbing includes both face and crack routes, the former often runout due to limited numbers of bolts, and the latter frequently following very thin cracks. The local ethic is to limit the placement of bolts on new routes and to forbid the addition of bolts to existing routes, resulting in distances of 40 feet (12 m) or more between bolts.

The major domes include:
 Stately Pleasure Dome
 Polly Dome
 Daff Dome
 Pothole Dome
 Lembert Dome
 Fairview Dome

See Granite Domes of Yosemite National Park for a list of granite domes in Yosemite National park, not just around Tuolumne.

In addition, the peaks of the nearby Cathedral Range, such as Cathedral Peak, Pywiack Dome, and Medlicott Dome, are traditionally considered part of the climbing area.

Infrastructure
The Tuolumne Meadows area is served by the Tioga Pass Road (California SR 120), which had been paved by the 1920s.   Its present route through the meadows was laid out in the 1930s by the Civilian Conservation Corps.  A housing area for seasonal employees was relocated at that time, whose new site includes a surviving collection of fine National Park Service rustic CCC-built structures listed on the National Register of Historic Places as "Tuolumne Meadows" in 1978.

References

External links

 National Park Service Maps
 Tuolumne Meadows Day Hikes
 Tuolumne Meadows Campground Site Photos

Landforms of Yosemite National Park
Grasslands of California
Landforms of Tuolumne County, California
Climbing areas of California
History of Tuolumne County, California
Parks on the National Register of Historic Places in California
Tourist attractions in Tuolumne County, California
National Register of Historic Places in Tuolumne County, California
National Register of Historic Places in Yosemite National Park
Meadows in the United States